Durham Palestine Educational Trust is a British charity that offers scholarships to outstanding graduates in Palestine to take master's degree courses at Durham University.

Aims 
This charity aims to contribute to the social and economic development of the Palestinian Authority by offering master's degree scholarships at Durham University for Palestinian graduates.

The skills gained on these courses have an importance far beyond the students' personal and professional development. The practical and research experience they gain will benefit many other Palestinians when they return home.

Scholarships 
The scholarships are advertised in Al-Quds and other Palestinian newspapers and on the Trust's website  at the beginning of January each year. Normally, the closing date for applications is 28 February. They are open to outstanding graduates of all Palestinian universities.

Starting in 1984 (initially it was called the Durham Birzeit Studentship Fund), the Trust has brought students from the West Bank and Gaza to study in a wide variety of academic departments, including Archaeology, Chemistry, Computer Science, Durham Business School, Economics, Engineering, English, Mathematics, Modern Languages, Physics and Social Work.

Funding 
Durham University contributes significantly by offering tuition fee scholarships to the successful candidates. Funds necessary to cover the students' maintenance, travel and other costs are raised by voluntary donations from individuals, mainly current and retired staff of the University and other people in the Durham area, and through fundraising events.

Patrons 
The Trust's Patrons are Professor Chris Higgins, Professor Ash Amin, Professor Sarah Banks, Professor John Clarke, Professor Ann Moss, Professor Michael Prestwich, Professor Brian Tanner, and Professor Sir Arnold Wolfendale.

The Trust is a democratic organisation and membership is open to all.

External links
The Trust's website

Education in the State of Palestine
Educational organizations based in the State of Palestine
Durham University
Charities based in County Durham